Daniel Sarmiento Melián (born 25 August 1983) is a Spanish retired handballer, who last played for Wisła Płock and the Spanish national team.

He was part of the Spanish team that won the world title on home soil in 2013.

References

External links

FCB profile

1983 births
Living people
Spanish male handball players
Liga ASOBAL players
CB Ademar León players
FC Barcelona Handbol players
Wisła Płock (handball) players
Handball players at the 2012 Summer Olympics
Olympic handball players of Spain
Expatriate handball players
Spanish expatriate sportspeople in France
Sportspeople from Las Palmas
Handball players at the 2020 Summer Olympics
Medalists at the 2020 Summer Olympics
Olympic bronze medalists for Spain
Olympic medalists in handball